Genome Biology is a peer-reviewed open access scientific journal covering research in genomics. It was established in 2000 and is published by BioMed Central. The chief editor is currently Andrew Cosgrove (BioMed Central, New York).

Abstracting and indexing
The journal is abstracted and indexed in:

According to the Journal Citation Reports, the journal has a 2019 impact factor of 10.806.

References

External links

BioMed Central academic journals
Genetics in the United Kingdom
Genetics journals
Genomics journals
Creative Commons Attribution-licensed journals
Online-only journals